Guo Hong'an (2 February 1943 – 16 January 2023) was a Chinese translator most notable for being one of the main translators into Chinese of the works of the French poet Charles Baudelaire and Albert Camus.

Biography
Guo was born in Laiwu County, Shandong, on 2 February 1943. After graduating from the Department of Western Languages, Peking University in 1966, he successively worked as a staff of the Second Artillery Command and translator of the Xinhua News Agency. From 1975 to 1977, he studied at the French School of Language and Culture at the University of Geneva in Switzerland.

Guo returned to China in 1977 and did his postgraduate work at the Graduate School of the Chinese Academy of Social Sciences. Guo started to publish translations in 1978, and joined the China Writers Association in 1986.

Guo died in Beijing on 16 January 2023, at the age of 79.

Translations
 Collected Works of Albert Camus (Albert Camus)
 Notesof Albert Camus: 1935–1959 (Albert Camus)
 The Outsider/ Sisyphus Myth (Albert Camus)
 Yves Bonnefoy (Yves Bonnefoy)
 Selected Papers on Baudelaire's Aesthetics (Charles Baudelaire)
 The Flower of Evil (Charles Baudelaire)
 The Melancholy of Paris (Charles Baudelaire)
 Artificial Paradise (Charles Baudelaire)

Awards
 2012 Fu Lei Translation and Publishing Award for translation of Recueil, written by Albert Camus.

References

1943 births
2023 deaths
People from Laiwu
Peking University alumni
University of Geneva alumni
French–Chinese translators